Travel Man is a British television travel documentary series, presented by Richard Ayoade and, since Series 10, Joe Lycett.

Description 
The programme focuses on the presenter travelling to a popular city in each episode, accompanied by a celebrity guest, to provide viewers a potential itinerary for a two-day (48-hour) break. The series is characterised by a fast-paced format, consumer advice and light humour.

In July 2019, Channel 4 announced that Ayoade would be leaving the show after the ninth series and would be replaced as host by comedian Joe Lycett. His first episode was broadcast on 27 December 2021.

It is produced by North One Television for Channel 4. 

It is broadcast on SBS Television and SBS On Demand in Australia.

Accolades 
The programme has been twice nominated in the Best Features category at the BAFTAs and won Best Factual Programme three years running at the RTS Midlands awards.

Episodes

Series overview

Series 1

Series 2

Series 3

Series 4

Series 5

Series 6

Series 7

Series 8

Series 9

Series 10

Series 11

Home video
Travel Man Series 1 and 2 was released on DVD in October 2018.

Related programmes
Travel Man was a spin-off from the Ayoade-presented North One/Channel 4 series Gadget Man, which was first broadcast with Stephen Fry as host in 2012. Since this series was first broadcast, the franchise has been expanded by Channel 4/North One to include new commission Hobby Man, with Alex Brooker from Channel 4's Friday night comedy show The Last Leg as the main presenter. Similar to Travel Man, the format features a main presenter with a different guest each week, but each episode of the new programme is an hour long, rather than half an hour. Channel 4 has commissioned a four-part Hobby Man series, with each episode exploring three different British hobbies. The guests for the series are Joe Wilkinson, Scarlett Moffatt, Joe Thomas and Andi Oliver.

References

External links
Channel 4

RadioTimes

2015 British television series debuts
2010s British travel television series
2020s British travel television series
Channel 4 documentaries
Television series by All3Media
English-language television shows